Anil Shivajirao Bhosale is a politician of the Nationalist Congress Party. On 23 November 2016 he was re-elected to the Maharashtra Legislative Council from Local Areas Constituency of Pune. He was representing the same seat from 2010-2016 as well.
On 25 February 2020, Bhosale along with three others was arrested in connection with embezzlement of ₹4.94 billion (US$65.3 million) at Shivajirao Bhosale cooperative bank. Bhosale was chairman and director of the bank at time of his arrest.

References

Living people
Nationalist Congress Party politicians from Maharashtra
Place of birth missing (living people)
1964 births